Kōgen-ji (向原寺, also written 広厳寺) is a Buddhist temple in Asuka, Nara Prefecture, Japan. It is affiliated with Jōdo Shinshū Buddhism. It is one of the Twenty-five Kansai flower temples.

See also 
Historical Sites of Prince Shōtoku

Buddhist temples in Nara Prefecture
Shinshū Honganji-ha temples
Prince Shōtoku